The Race House is an Italianate style house located at 3945 North Tripp Avenue in the Irving Park neighborhood of Chicago, Illinois, United States.  The house was built in 1874 by an unknown architect for Stephen A. Race. It was designated a Chicago Landmark on September 22, 1988.

History
This home is significant in the history of Chicago and the neighborhood of Irving Park.  It is the only remaining home of the original founders of Irving Park – the Race family.  The Stephen A. Race house is a rare Chicago example of a red brick Italianate structure with its architectural integrity for the most part still intact.  Originally sited on Irving Park Boulevard, a road that was once an Indian trail in early Illinois, the home's style is especially representative of the type of grand residential dwellings that once lined Irving Park Boulevard in the mid- to late-nineteenth century, when Irving Park was a suburban/country retreat.

When originally built, the home cost $12,000 – a significant amount of money in 1873.  The Charles T. Race House, which no longer exists, was slightly grander in scale and cost $15,000.  Both homes were of the Italianate style, one of the most popular architectural styles between 1850 and 1880.  While the architect's name is unknown to us today, the similarities of the Race homes indicate the brothers used the same architect.

Description
The Stephen A. Race House is a classic Victorian Italianate – built from 1873 to 1874 for Stephen A. Race, one of the founders of Irving Park, along with his brother, Charles T. Race, principal founder and developer of Irving Park.

Four stories high, the Stephen A. Race House is composed of red brick contrasted with white limestone and painted wood trim; its style is derived from the villas of Tuscany in Northern Italy, which are characterized by a symmetrical box shape capped by a flat roof.  Large eave brackets dominate the cornice line of Italianate houses.  On the Race House, these are over-scaled, elaborately scrolled and arranged in pairs – typical of this era and style.

Particularly arresting is the treatment of the windows on the second level.  Tall and thin, with two-over-two lights, they are emphatically framed with semi-circular arches stamped by a prominent limestone keystone.

Alterations
The exterior of the first floor of this home has been altered, most probably when it was moved early in the 20th century (a historic plaque outside the home states 1924, but other sources mention 1905).  You'll note that breaking the straightforward configuration of the house is a large bay window – a late Victorian addition.  This bay window replaced two tall windows on the first floor that aligned and fell directly below the two second floor windows on the left.  Up on the porch you can see the placement of the original windows if you look at the Indiana limestone blocks that line the perimeter of the home on the first level.  The exterior front doors were also most likely modified during this period.  Originally, the exterior set of doors would have echoed the arched doorway and doors of the interior set.

The front porch on the home is not original.  It was built in 2001 and is a replica of the porch that previously fronted the home, and which was most built after the home was moved from Irving Park Boulevard and onto Tripp Avenue.  Originally, the home had a cast-iron staircase, resting on a limestone base, probably about the same width of the existing staircase that would have led to a landing and the double front doors.

It is thought that the windows, porch and doors were all modified at the same time to coincide with the movement of the house – and updated to reflect the tastes of the late Victorian era.

To fully appreciate this house, it is best to remember that it was moved from its original position on Irving Park Boulevard on what was then a more spacious landscaped lot.  The home is still sited on a portion of the original lot, but was pivoted 90 degrees, so that instead of facing north, it now faces west.  It was moved as Irving Park Boulevard became more commercial.  Facing Irving Park Boulevard, the home and its lot occupied half of the north-facing block.  Where the house is now located was most probably where the stables and out buildings of the home would have been located.  Using the city lot maps of today, this home occupied what are now five city lots.

It was during this commercial building boom along Irving Park Boulevard that its companion house, the Charles T. Race home, was demolished.  The home has undergone some changes in nearly 140 years, but luckily, those changes have not impacted the architectural integrity of the home significantly.  Mark Gregory Jones and Bradley Maury purchased the house in 2002 and completed extensive restoration and renovation of the home, and transformed the previously unfinished third floor walk-up attic into a master suite. Jones and Maury retained the property for 12 years before selling the home in 2014 to Chris and Alison Domino. The Dominos sold the home in 2019 to the current owners, Dana and Drew Sarros.

The stained glass in the front living room window was installed in 2002 and is a reproduction of the original stained glass panel, with the exception of the colors.  The current owners were able to locate a black and white photograph, which provided the template for this recreating this stained glass panel.

During the late 1980s and early 1990s, when the home was abandoned and in disrepair, four white Carrara marble fireplace mantels, along with the newel post for the front hall, were stolen.  All the fireplaces have been replaced with fireplaces of the period however and the newel post replaced with a similar period piece.  The woodwork throughout the house is painted and is of a very robust and exuberant style, which is typical of Italianate homes of this period.

References

History of the Stephen A. Race House, 2002, Mark Gregory Jones

Houses completed in 1874
Houses in Chicago
Chicago Landmarks